"Devil in the Bottle" is a song written by Bobby David and recorded by American country music artist T. G. Sheppard (not counting his two earlier non-country singles issued as by "Brian Stacy").  It was released in October 1974 as his debut single and the first from his album T. G. Sheppard, and reached number one on the U.S. country singles chart.  The single spent a single week at number one and a total of ten weeks on the chart.  The single was released on the Melodyland Label, a country music, Motown subsidiary.

Chart performance

Cover versions
"Devil in the Bottle" was covered by Hank Williams Jr. on his 2003 album I'm One of You. It was released in 2004 as the album's third single and peaked at number 59 on the Billboard Hot Country Singles & Tracks chart.

The Southern Rock band Lynyrd Skynyrd also included a cover of "Devil in the Bottle" on their 1994 album release titled Endangered Species (Lynyrd Skynyrd album).  An album that features mostly acoustic instrumentations, as well as Ronnie Van Zant's younger brother, Johnny, as the lead vocalist. The song takes the spot of track number three and features Mike Estes, Gary Rossington, Dale Krantz, and Johnny Van Zant together on the track. It is the only Lynyrd Skynyrd album to feature Mike Estes on guitar.

References

1974 songs
1974 debut singles
2004 singles
T. G. Sheppard songs
Hank Williams Jr. songs
Curb Records singles
Songs about alcohol